1958 in sports describes the year's events in world sport.

American football
 NFL Championship: the Baltimore Colts won 23–17 (OT) over the New York Giants at Yankee Stadium (later called the "Greatest game ever played")

Artistic gymnastics
 World Artistic Gymnastics Championships
Men's all-around champion: Boris Shakhlin, USSR
Women's all-around champion: Larisa Latynina, USSR
Team competition champions: men's – USSR; women's – USSR

Association football
 February 6 – Munich air disaster.  23 people died as a result of the crash at Munich airport including 7 Manchester United players:
 Geoff Bent (25)
 Roger Byrne (28)
 Eddie Colman (21)
 Mark Jones (24)
 David Pegg (22)
 Tommy Taylor (26)
 Liam Whelan (22)
 Duncan Edwards (21), who died of his injuries on 21 February
 Also killed was former Manchester City and England goalkeeper Frank Swift (44), who was then a reporter

FIFA World Cup
 1958 World Cup held in Sweden. Brazil beat Sweden 5–2 in the final.

Europe
 European Cup – Real Madrid beat A.C. Milan 3–2.
 Inter-Cities Fairs Cup – FC Barcelona beat London XI 8–2 on aggregate.

England
 First Division – Wolverhampton Wanderers win the 1957–58 title.
 FA Cup – Bolton Wanderers beat Manchester United 2–0.

Athletics
 Sixth European Championships, held from August 19 to August 24 in Stockholm, Sweden

Australian rules football
 Victorian Football League
 Collingwood wins the 62nd VFL Premiership (Collingwood 12.10 (82) d Melbourne 9.10 (64))
 Brownlow Medal was awarded to Neil Roberts (St Kilda)

Baseball
 January 29 – The Brooklyn Dodgers catcher Roy Campanella suffers a broken neck in an early morning auto accident on Long Island. His spinal column is nearly severed and his legs are permanently paralyzed.
 January 30 – Commissioner Ford Frick announces that players and coaches, rather than the fans, will vote for the All-Star teams.
 April 15 – San Francisco Giants pitcher Rubén Gómez won baseball's first regular season game on the West Coast. He started the first game in San Francisco history, beating Don Drysdale and the visiting Los Angeles Dodgers in an 8-0 shutout at Seals Stadium. The two teams moved from New York after the 1957 season.
 World Series – New York Yankees win 4 games to 3 over the Milwaukee Braves. The Series MVP is pitcher Bob Turley of New York.

Basketball
 NCAA Men's Basketball Championship –
 Kentucky wins 84–72 over Seattle
 NBA Finals:
 St. Louis Hawks win 4 games to 2 over the Boston Celtics
 A FIBA European Champions Cup (present day of Euro Basketball League), first official game held on February 22, and Rīgas ASK won first season on title.

Boxing
 December 10 – Light-heavyweight champion Archie Moore is knocked down three times in the first round and once more in the fifth round by Yvon Durelle but Moore held on to come back to knock out Durelle in the 11th round.

Canadian football
 The Canadian Football League is officially established in its present form.
 Grey Cup – Winnipeg Blue Bombers win 35–28 over the Hamilton Tiger-Cats

Cycling
 Tour de France won by Charly Gaul of Luxembourg
 September 13 – death in a racing accident of Russell Mockridge (30), Australian racing cyclist

Figure skating
 World Figure Skating Championships:
 Men's champion: David Jenkins, United States
 Ladies' champion: Carol Heiss, United States
 Pair skating champions: Barbara Wagner & Robert Paul, Canada
 Ice dancing champions: June Markham & Courtney Jones, Great Britain

Golf
Men's professional
 Masters Tournament – Arnold Palmer
 U.S. Open – Tommy Bolt
 British Open – Peter Thomson
 PGA Championship – Dow Finsterwald
 PGA Tour money leader – Arnold Palmer – $42,608
Men's amateur
 British Amateur – Joe Carr
 U.S. Amateur – Charles Coe
Women's professional
 Women's Western Open – Patty Berg
 LPGA Championship – Mickey Wright
 U.S. Women's Open – Mickey Wright
 Titleholders Championship – Beverly Hanson
 LPGA Tour money leader – Beverly Hanson – $12,639

Harness racing
 United States Pacing Triple Crown races:
 Cane Pace – Raider Frost
 Little Brown Jug – Shadow Wave
 Messenger Stakes – O'Brien Hanover
 United States Trotting Triple Crown races:
 Hambletonian – Emily's Pride
 Yonkers Trot – Spunky Hanover
 Kentucky Futurity – Emily's Pride
 Australian Inter Dominion Harness Racing Championship:
 Pacers: Free Hall

Horse racing
 Tim Tam, who had won the Kentucky Derby and Preakness, fractured a sesamoid bone and lost his chance for the Triple Crown when he hobbled across the finish line in second place at the Belmont Stakes.
Steeplechases
 Cheltenham Gold Cup – Kerstin
 Grand National – Mr What
Flat races
 Australia – Melbourne Cup won by Baystone
 Canada – Queen's Plate won by Caledon Beau
 France – Prix de l'Arc de Triomphe won by Ballymoss
 Ireland – Irish Derby Stakes won by Sindon
 English Triple Crown Races:
 2,000 Guineas Stakes – Pall Mall
 The Derby – Hard Ridden
 St. Leger Stakes – Alcide
 United States Triple Crown Races:
 Kentucky Derby – Tim Tam
 Preakness Stakes – Tim Tam
 Belmont Stakes – Cavan

Ice hockey
 January 18 – Willie O'Ree makes his NHL debut with the Boston Bruins. He is the first Black Canadian to play in the  National Hockey League.
 Art Ross Trophy as the NHL's leading scorer during the regular season: Dickie Moore, Montreal Canadiens
 Hart Memorial Trophy for the NHL's Most Valuable Player: Gordie Howe, Detroit Red Wings
 Stanley Cup – Montreal Canadiens win 4–2 over the Boston Bruins
 World Hockey Championship
 Men's champion: Whitby Dunlops from Canada defeat the Soviet Union
 NCAA Men's Ice Hockey Championship – University of Denver Pioneers defeat University of North Dakota Fighting Sioux 6–2 in Minneapolis, Minnesota

Motorsport

Pétanque
 The sport's international federation is founded in Marseille

Rugby league
1958 New Zealand rugby league season
1958 NSWRFL season
1957–58 Northern Rugby Football League season / 1958–59 Northern Rugby Football League season

Rugby union
 64th Five Nations Championship series is won by England

Skiing
Men's FIS World Championships:
Downhill: Toni Sailer (Austria)
Giant Slalom: Toni Sailer (Austria)
Slalom: Josl Rieder (Austria)
Combined: Toni Sailer (Austria)
Women's FIS World Championships:
Downhill: Lucille Wheeler (Canada)
Giant Slalom: Lucille Wheeler (Canada)
Slalom: Inger Bjørnbakken (Norway)
Combined: Frieda Dänzer (Switzerland)

Swimming
 June 29 – US swimmer Nancy Ramey sets the first official world record in the women's 200m butterfly at a meet in Los Angeles, clocking 2:40.5.
 September 13 – Tineke Lagerberg from the Netherlands takes over the world record in the women's 200m butterfly during a meet in Naarden, the Netherlands – 2:38.9.

Tennis
Australia
 Australian Men's Singles Championship – Ashley Cooper (Australia) defeats Malcolm Anderson (Australia) 7–5, 6–3, 6–4
 Australian Women's Singles Championship – Angela Mortimer Barrett (Great Britain) defeats Lorraine Coghlan Robinson (Australia) 6–3, 6–4
England
 Wimbledon Men's Singles Championship – Ashley Cooper (Australia) defeats Neale Fraser (Australia) 3–6, 6–3, 6–4, 13–11
 Wimbledon Women's Singles Championship – Althea Gibson (USA) defeats Angela Mortimer (Great Britain) 8–6, 6–2
France
 French Men's Singles Championship – Mervyn Rose (Australia) defeats Luis Ayala (Chile) 6–3, 6–4, 6–4
 French Women's Singles Championship – Zsuzsa Körmöczy (Hungary) defeats Shirley Bloomer (Great Britain) 6–4, 1–6, 6–2
USA
 American Men's Singles Championship – Ashley Cooper (Australia) defeats Malcolm Anderson (Australia) 6–2, 3–6, 4–6, 10–8, 8–6
 American Women's Singles Championship – Althea Gibson (USA) defeats Darlene Hard (USA) 3–6, 6–1, 6–2
Davis Cup
 1958 Davis Cup –  3–2  at Milton Courts (grass) Brisbane, Australia

Yacht racing
 The New York Yacht Club retains the America's Cup as Columbia defeats British challenger Sceptre, of the Royal Yacht Squadron, 4 races to 0; it is the first Cup series held in the era of the 12-metre yacht.

Multi-sport events
 Asian Games held in Tokyo, Japan
 1958 British Empire and Commonwealth Games held in Cardiff, Wales

Awards
 Associated Press Male Athlete of the Year – Herb Elliott, Track and field
 Associated Press Female Athlete of the Year – Althea Gibson, Tennis

References

 
Sports by year